Pratt Branch is a  long 2nd order tributary to Spring Creek in Kent County, Delaware.

Variant names
According to the Geographic Names Information System, it has also been known historically as:  
Bratts Branch
Pratt's Branch

Course
Pratts Branch rises on the Fan Branch divide at Felton, Delaware.  Pratt Branch then flows northeasterly to meet Spring Creek about 2.5 miles northwest of Frederica, Delaware.

Watershed
Pratts Branch drains  of area, receives about 45.0 in/year of precipitation, has a topographic wetness index of 569.67 and is about 7.0% forested.

See also
List of Delaware rivers

Maps

References

Rivers of Delaware
Rivers of Kent County, Delaware
Tributaries of the Murderkill River